Farleys House near Chiddingly, East Sussex, has been converted into a museum and archive featuring the lives and work of its former residents, the photographer Lee Miller and the Surrealist artist Roland Penrose. It also houses a collection of contemporary art by their friends Pablo Picasso, Man Ray, Max Ernst and Joan Miró.

Details
Lee Miller and Roland Penrose came to live at Farley Farm in 1949 and, in the thirty five years they lived there, built up a collection of contemporary art. Many of these were made by their friends and visitors, including Pablo Picasso, Man Ray, Max Ernst and Joan Miró. These artworks were assembled by Miller and Penrose, along with other works from all over the world by their son Antony Penrose, who has transformed the barn into an art gallery for upcoming and local artists to show their work. The house is surrounded by a sculpture garden and Lee Miller's vegetable patches.

Picasso visited Miller and Penrose at Farley Farm on 11 and 15 November 1950. On his second visit he created a drawing in Indian ink on the first two pages of the ICA visitors book, of bulls with grasshopper's wings perched on twigs. The drawing is thought to have been inspired by his visit that day to the dairy on Penrose's farm, where he encountered William, the Ayrshire bull. The ICA visitor's book containing this and drawings by other key artists is now in the collection of the Department of Prints and Drawings at the British Museum, London. A lithograph of the drawing is on display in Farley Farm House and it is considered to be one of only two works Picasso created in England on his visit, the other being the mural on the wall of Professor John Desmond Bernal's flat in London, dated 12 November 1950.

See also
 List of museums devoted to one photographer

References

Further reading

External links
Farleys House & Gallery official site
Lee Miller official site
Roland Penrose official site
Creative-Freelance – review
uckfieldnews.com

Historic house museums in East Sussex
Art museums and galleries in East Sussex
Chiddingly